The Gallipoli Cathedral, formally the Co-Cathedral Basilica of Saint Agatha the Virgin, is a Roman Catholic church located in the town of Gallipoli in Apulia, Italy. Completed in 1696, the Baroque church is a minor basilica and the co-cathedral of the Diocese of Nardò-Gallipoli.

History 
The Gallipoli Cathedral was constructed between 1629 and 1696, and is dedicated to Saint Agatha of Sicily.

Architecture 
The Baroque facade of the cathedral was designed by Giuseppe Zimbalo, Francesco Bischetini, and Scipione Lachibari. It is constructed out of carparo stone, sourced from Southern Italy. The church was built with a cruciform floorpan in the shape of a Latin cross.

Interior 
The interior of the church is a mixture of the Byzantine and Renaissance styles. The nave is flanked by columns of grey marble, which support an arcade. The interior is ornamented by paintings by Giovanni Andrea Coppola, a painter native to Gallipoli. Nicolò Malinconico painted the frescoes on the walls and in the cupola, which depicts the martyrdom of Saint Agatha.

The cathedral's altar is made of a reused Ancient Roman marble stele. There is an Ancient Greek inscription on the stele that reads:

Translated into English:
I am a most precious gift . . . I was placed on the remarkable altar . . . , which belonged
to Marsilios, three times glittering and three times luminous. Acceding to the ardent
desire of Magi . . . os, patron and priest, lord bishop Pantoleon, holder of this throne,
sits with great piety.

See also 

 Diocesan Museum of Gallipoli

References

Citations

Sources

External links 

Roman Catholic cathedrals in Italy
Cathedrals in Apulia
Basilica churches in Apulia
Churches in the province of Lecce
1696 establishments in Italy